Eugène Sue was a 1974 French television film on the life of the author Eugène Sue, played by Bernard Verley.  It was directed by Jacques Nahum and written by Jean-Louis Bory.

Cast
Bernard Verley - Eugène Sue 
Jean Davy - Father and commissioner 
Pierre Arditi - Ernest Legouvé 
Loleh Bellon - Marie D'Argoult, muse of Franz Liszt
Geneviève Casile - Duchesse de Rozan 
Claudine Coster - Olympe Pélissier 
Jacques Ferrière - Balzac 
Marcel Cuvelier - Napoléon III 
Jack Ary - Marshal Soult
Raluca Sterian - La Polonaise 
Roland Lesaffre - The prefect 
Guy Mairesse - The gaoler
Gilbert Beugniot - Emile de Girardin 
Fernand Guiot - Bertin 
Francis Roussef - King's attaché

External links

Wandering Jew and Jewess

Biographical films about writers
1974 television films
1974 films
French television films